A bar mleczny (literally translated as "milk bar" from Polish) is a Polish cafeteria which during the Communist era provided government-subsidized traditional Polish cuisine at low cost. The name comes from cheese cutlets, which were often sold when meat was rare.

History
The first milk bar, called "Mleczarnia Nadświdrzańska," was established in 1896 in Warsaw by Stanisław Dłużewski, a member of the Polish landed gentry. Although the typical bar mleczny had a menu based on dairy items, these establishments generally also served other, non-dairy traditional Polish dishes as well. 

The commercial success of the first milk bars encouraged other businessmen to copy this type of restaurant. As Poland regained its independence after World War I, milk bars appeared across most of the country. They offered relatively cheap but nourishing food, and thus achieved even more prominence during the economic depression of the 1930s and World War II.  

After the fall of the Nazi regime, Poland became a communist state in the Eastern Bloc. Contrary to official propaganda, the majority of the population was poor, and even moderately-priced restaurants were derided as "capitalist". During the post-war years, most restaurants were nationalized and then closed down by the communist authorities. In the mid-1960s, milk bars were common as a means of offering cheap meals to people working in companies that had no official canteen. They still served mostly dairy-based and vegetarian meals, especially during the period of martial law in the early 1980s, when meat was rationed. 

The prevalent idea at that time was to provide all people with cheap meals at the place of their employment. At times, the price of the meals served in the workplace canteens was included in a worker's salary. However, there was also a large number of people working in smaller firms that had no canteen at their disposal. Because of this, during the tenure of Władysław Gomułka, the authorities created a network of small self-service eateries. The meals, subsidized by the state, were cheap and easily available to anyone.

Apart from raw or processed dairy products, milk bars also served egg (omelets or egg cutlets), cereal or flour-based meals such as pierogi. After the fall of the communist system and the end of the centrally planned economy, the majority of milk bars went bankrupt, as they were superseded by regular restaurants. However, some of them were preserved as relics of the communist era welfare state to support the poorer members of Polish society. 

In the early 2010s, milk bars began to make a comeback. They became small, inexpensive restaurants that took advantage of PRL nostalgia, while providing good quality food and customer service. Due to their good locations, milk bars often fall victim to gentrification and are defended by activist groups. Today milk bars are privately owned, but partly subsidized by the state, which allows it to offer low prices.

See also
 Polish cuisine
 Greasy spoon
Mickie's Dairy Bar

References

External links
A list of Polish bary mleczne
" Nostalgia in a Polish 'milk bar'," CNN
BBC video report about bary mleczne

Cafeteria-style restaurants
Restaurants in Poland
Restaurants by type